EarthWorld is a BBC Books original novel written by Jacqueline Rayner and based on the long-running British science fiction television series Doctor Who. It features the Eighth Doctor, Fitz and Anji.

EarthWorld was re-released in 2013 for the 50th anniversary of Doctor Who.

External links

2001 British novels
2001 science fiction novels
Eighth Doctor Adventures
Novels by Jacqueline Rayner